Hernán Darío Bernardello (born 3 August 1986) is an Argentine footballer who plays as a defensive midfielder for Club Atlético Belgrano.

Club career

Newell's Old Boys
Born in Rosario, Santa Fe, Bernardello made his professional debuts in 2006 with Newell's Old Boys, going on to play in three full Primera División seasons with the club.

He scored his first goal for the Rosario-based team in a match against Argentinos Juniors, a 4–0 win.

Almería
On 20 July 2009, Bernardello signed a six-year deal with UD Almería in Spain, who paid €3 million for his services. He made his La Liga debut on 30 August in a 0–0 home draw against Real Valladolid, and only missed eight matches for the Andalusians in his first two seasons combined, suffering relegation in his second.

On 26 July 2012, Bernardello moved on loan to Club Atlético Colón.

Montreal Impact
On 23 July 2013, the Montreal Impact in the Major League Soccer signed Bernardello as a designated player, with the club's director of football, Nick De Santis, describing him as a player with "great quality in midfield", "great technical skills and great ability to relaunch attacks". He made his debut on 7 August in a 1–0 home win over the San Jose Earthquakes for the season's CONCACAF Champions League, where he provided the assist for the winning goal.

Bernadello parted ways with Montreal on 1 July 2014, after failing to agree new terms.

International career
On 20 May 2009, Bernardello made his debut for Argentina, in a friendly match with Panama. The national team, solely made up of players based in the domestic league, won it 3–1.

Honours
Montreal Impact
Canadian Championship: 2014

Alavés
Segunda División: 2015–16

References

External links
  
 
 
 
 

1986 births
Living people
Footballers from Rosario, Santa Fe
Argentine footballers
Association football midfielders
Newell's Old Boys footballers
UD Almería players
Club Atlético Colón footballers
CF Montréal players
Cruz Azul footballers
Deportivo Alavés players
Godoy Cruz Antonio Tomba footballers
Club Atlético Belgrano footballers
Argentine Primera División players
Primera Nacional players
La Liga players
Segunda División players
Major League Soccer players
Designated Players (MLS)
Liga MX players
Argentina international footballers
Argentine expatriate footballers
Expatriate footballers in Spain
Expatriate soccer players in Canada
Expatriate footballers in Mexico
Argentine expatriate sportspeople in Spain
Argentine expatriate sportspeople in Canada
Argentine expatriate sportspeople in Mexico